= Abasiono Uwemedimo Akpan =

Nigerian athlete (born 2000)

Abasiono Uwemedimo Akpan (born December 15, 2000) is a Nigerian athlete who specializes in the 400m hurdles. She represented Nigeria at the 2023 African Games held in Accra, Ghana, competing in the women's 400m hurdles event.

== Early life and background ==
Akpan was born in Nigeria and began her athletic career during her early years. Her interest in athletics led her to specialize in hurdling, particularly the 400m hurdles.

== 2023 African Games ==
In 2023, Akpan represented Nigeria at the African Games in the Women's 400m Hurdles. The African Games is a multi-sport event that features athletes from across the continent.
